Sebastian Ploner (27 May 1907 – December 1981 ) was an Austrian water polo player. He competed in the men's tournament at the 1936 Summer Olympics.

References

External links
 

1907 births
1981 deaths
Austrian male water polo players
Olympic water polo players of Austria
Water polo players at the 1936 Summer Olympics
Place of birth missing
Place of death missing